(February 3, 1926 –  May 5, 2015) was a Japanese screenwriter.

Partial filmography

Film 

 Ginza no onna (1955)
 The Motherless (1955)
 The Wind-of-Youth Group Crosses the Mountain Pass (1961)
 Gamera, the Giant Monster (1965)
 Gamera vs. Barugon (1966)
 Gamera vs. Gyaos (1967)
 Gamera vs. Viras (1968)
 Gamera vs. Guiron (1969)
 Gamera vs. Jiger (1970)
 Gamera vs. Zigra (1971)
 Gamera: Super Monster (1980)

Television 

 Thunder Mask (1972) [episodes 19, 21]
 Zatoichi Monogatari (1974)

Bibliography 

  (1995)

References

Sources

External links 

 

2015 deaths
1926 births
Deaths from brain tumor
20th-century Japanese screenwriters